Orthosaris is a genus of moths of the family Yponomeutidae.

Species
Orthosaris strictulata - Meyrick, 1914 

Yponomeutidae